George Kiprotich "Kip" Rono (born 4 January 1958) is a Kenyan former steeplechase runner. He won a gold medal in the event at the 1979 African Championships in Athletics (becoming the inaugural champion) and was the first African steeplechase winner at the 1979 IAAF World Cup.

Rono ranked second fastest in the world in 1980 with a time of 8:12.0 minutes, but missed the 1980 Summer Olympics due to the boycott. He was a bronze medallist at both the Commonwealth Games and All-Africa Games in 1978, finishing behind Henry Rono. He represented his country at the World Championships in Athletics in 1983 and the Summer Olympics in 1984.

Career
Rono first came to prominence at the age of twenty by winning bronze medals in the 3000 metres steeplechase at both the 1978 Commonwealth Games and the 1978 All-Africa Games. At both events, there was a Kenyan medal sweep led by Henry Rono and James Munyala.
(Contemporary news reports stated that he was Henry Rono's brother.) The following year he established himself in his own right by winning steeplechase gold medals at the East and Central African Championships and the inaugural 1979 African Championships in Athletics (where he also claimed a 5000 metres bronze behind Ethiopia's Miruts Yifter and Yohannes Mohamed. His position as one of the world's leading steeplechasers was cemented at the 1979 IAAF World Cup, where he led by fifty metres before the last lap and became the first African man to win the steeplechase at that event.

The following year he was affected by the 1980 Summer Olympics boycott. Despite a run of 8:12.0 minutes at the Golden Gala in Rome – the second fastest that year after Bronisław Malinowski – he was unable to compete at a major competition. He did compete at the Liberty Bell Classic (Olympic Boycott Games) and while Malinowski took the steeplechase, Rono was the gold medallist in the 5000 m.

He won back-to-back steeplechase titles at the Kenyan Athletics Championships in 1983 to 1984. However, upon entering top level international competitions he proved to be past his best. At the 1983 World Championships in Athletics he ranked twentieth in the semi-finals with a time of 8:33.97 minutes. He went out in the first round at the 1984 Los Angeles Olympics, finishing ninth in his heat with a time of 8:41.75 minutes.

He declined in the steeplechase thereafter. His next international appearance came at the 1988 IAAF World Cross Country Championships. There he was part of a dominant Kenyan team led by John Ngugi which took all top nine placings (bar Ethiopia's Abebe Mekonnen in fifth). Rono shared in the team gold medals for his eighth-place finish.

Towards the end of his career, he focused on road running. In 1988 he was fourth at the Great Scottish Run and set a half marathon best of 1:00:52 hours to win the Semi Marathon du Lion. He was also runner-up at the Giro Podistico di Pettinengo and placed third at the AAA 10 Kilometres Championship.

National titles
Kenyan Athletics Championships
3000 metres steeplechase: 1983, 1984

International competitions

See also
List of champions of the African Athletics Championships

References

External links

Living people
1958 births
Kenyan male steeplechase runners
Kenyan male long-distance runners
Commonwealth Games medallists in athletics
Athletes (track and field) at the 1978 Commonwealth Games
World Athletics Championships athletes for Kenya
Olympic athletes of Kenya
Athletes (track and field) at the 1984 Summer Olympics
Commonwealth Games bronze medallists for Kenya
African Games bronze medalists for Kenya
African Games medalists in athletics (track and field)
Athletes (track and field) at the 1978 All-Africa Games
Medallists at the 1978 Commonwealth Games